Eulogy is an unincorporated community located in Holmes County, Mississippi, United States.

In 1900, Eulogy had a post office, and a population of 37. The post office was operating from 1849 to 1909. Popular Springs Church was located here.

References

Former populated places in Holmes County, Mississippi
Former populated places in Mississippi